The Kraus Corset Factory is a historic industrial property at 33 Roosevelt Drive in Derby, Connecticut.  The oldest portion of the large brick building, built in 1879, faces Third Street, while a c. 1910 addition extends along Roosevelt Drive.  It is the only major building to survive from Derby's period of corset manufacturing.  It was built by Sidney Downs, one of Derby's leading businessmen of the period.  The building was listed on the National Register of Historic Places on February 12, 1987. It has been converted into apartments.

Description and history
The Kraus Corset Factory is located adjacent to downtown Derby, extending mainly along Roosevelt Drive (Connecticut Route 34) northwest of Third Street.  The factory is composed of two structures, the main 1879 block, and the c. 1910 addition.  The main block is built of brick and is three stories in height, with nine bays facing Third Street and ten facing Roosevelt.  The windows are set in segmented-arch openings, with stone sills.  Shed-roof dormers project from the roof faces.  The addition is a wood-frame structure, also three stories in height, but with a fully-exposed basement level facing the street.

The factory's main block was built in 1879 by Sidney Downs, a prominent local businessman who had previously engaged in other corset-making partnerships.  He leased this factory to Leopold Kraus whose firm employed about a quarter of Derby's corsetmakers.  This business was only successful into the early 1890s, and had been swallowed by competition by 1896.  The site next housed businesses engaged in a variety of metalworking pursuits related to corsetry, and in 1907 it was acquired by Sterling Pin.  Pinmaking was another major business in Derby, and Sterling expanded the plant to manufacture pins, hairpins, clasps and eyes, and other small wire-based products.  It remained in business at this site into the 1970s.

See also
Baystate Corset Block, NRHP-listed in Springfield, Massachusetts 
Strouse, Adler Company Corset Factory, NRHP-listed in New Haven, Connecticut
Worcester Corset Company Factory, NRHP-listed in Worcester, Massachusetts
National Register of Historic Places listings in New Haven County, Connecticut

References

Buildings and structures in Derby, Connecticut
National Register of Historic Places in New Haven County, Connecticut
Industrial buildings completed in 1879
Industrial buildings and structures on the National Register of Historic Places in Connecticut
Corsetry
Textile mills in the United States
1879 establishments in Connecticut